Statistics of Belgian First Division in the 1913–14 season.

Overview

It was contested by 12 teams, and Daring Club won the championship.

Because they finished level on points in 10th/11th place, A.A. La Gantoise and Standard Club Liégeois played a Test Match to decide who would stay up: this was won by La Gantoise, thus relegating Liégeois to the Promotion Division.

League standings

Results

See also
1913–14 in Belgian football

References

Belgian Pro League seasons
Belgian First Division, 1913-14
1913–14 in Belgian football